The 1922 Nevada Sagebrushers football team was an American football team that represented the University of Nevada as an independent during the 1922 college football season. In their fourth season under head coach Ray Courtright, the team compiled a 5–3–1 record and outscored its opponents by a total of 166 to 120.

George Hobbs was the 1922 team captain.

Schedule

References

Nevada
Nevada Wolf Pack football seasons
Nevada Football